Tosanoides filamentosus is a species of reef fish from the subfamily Anthiinae part of the family Serranidae, the groupers and sea basses. native to the northwest Pacific Ocean around Japan and can be found in depths of 50–60 meters. Tosanoides filamentosus is one of six species that make up the genus Tosanoides and it is the type species of that genus.

Description 
It is around 10 centimeters long.

References 

Taxa named by Toshiji Kamohara
Fish described in 1953
Fish of Japan
Fish of the Pacific Ocean
filamentosus